The Lauderdale County Courthouse is a PWA Moderne-style courthouse built in 1936.  It was listed on the National Register of Historic Places.

The two-story-plus-basement building's most prominent feature is its "vertical stepped massing".

It was designed by Nashville architects Marr and Holman and was built by R. M. Condra Contractors.  It was the first Public Works Administration-funded courthouse completed in Tennessee.

References

External links

National Register of Historic Places in Tennessee
PWA Moderne architecture in the United States
Government buildings completed in 1936
Lauderdale County, Tennessee
Courthouses in Tennessee